The Loma Gorda Formation (Kl, Kslg) is a fossiliferous geological formation of the Upper Magdalena Valley (VSM) and surrounding Central and Eastern Ranges of the Colombian Andes, extending from Cundinamarca in the north to Huila and easternmost Tolima in the south.

Etymology 
The formation was named in 1966 by De Porta, named Loma Gorda ("Fat Hill") in Ricaurte, Cundinamarca.

Description

Lithologies 
The Loma Gorda Formation is characterised by laminated siltstones and shales with calcareous concretions. The formation has provided fossils of Ankinatsytes venezolanus, Barroisiceras onilahyense, Codazziceras ospinae, Eulophoceras jacobi, Fagesia catinus, Hauericeras madagascarensis, Hoplitoides ingens, H. lagiraldae, Mitonia gracilis, Mytiloides kossmati, M. goppelnensis, M. scupini, Neoptychites cf. andinus, Paralenticeras sieversi, Paramammites sp., Peroniceras subtricarinatum, Prionocycloceras guayabanum, Reesidites subtuberculatum, Subprionotropis colombianus, Allocrioceras sp., Anagaudryceras sp., Anomia sp., Benueites sp., Choffaticeras sp., Dydimotis sp., Forresteria sp., Gauthiericeras sp., Morrowites sp., Nannovascoceras sp., and Quitmaniceras sp..

Stratigraphy and depositional environment 
The Loma Gorda Formation is the uppermost unit of the Güagüaquí Group. It overlies the Hondita Formation and is overlain by the Oliní Group. The age has been estimated on the basis of ammonites to be ranging from Turonian to Coniacian. Stratigraphically, the formation is time equivalent with the upper parts of the Chipaque, La Luna and La Frontera Formations. The formation was deposited in a relative highstand sequence with an oceanic oxygen depletion event, sharply marked in Colombia and characterised by the appearance of calcareous concretions with a thick pyrite rim.

Outcrops 

The type locality of the Loma Gorda Formation is located close to Loma Gorda in Ricaurte, Cundinamarca. Other outcrops of the Loma Gorda Formation have been noted east of the Magdalena River northeast of Honda, west of Nariño, west across the Magdalena River in San Luis, Tolima, between the Tetuán and Saldaña Rivers west of Coyaima and east and west of Ataco, to the east of the Prado River reservoir, north and west of Aipe, surrounding Alpujarra, Tolima, south of Palermo, Huila, displaced by the Baché Fault, east of Iquira, north of Yaguará, south of La Plata where the formation is cut by the Itaibe Fault, a small patch east of Gigante, Huila, northwest and northeast of San Agustín, and north of Timaná surrounding the Magdalena River.

Regional correlations

See also 

  Geology of the Eastern Hills
  Geology of the Ocetá Páramo
  Geology of the Altiplano Cundiboyacense
  Geology of the Middle Magdalena Valley

Notes

References

Bibliography

Maps

External links 
 

Geologic formations of Colombia
Cretaceous Colombia
Upper Cretaceous Series of South America
Turonian Stage
Coniacian Stage
Shale formations
Siltstone formations
Open marine deposits
Fossiliferous stratigraphic units of South America
Paleontology in Colombia
Formations
Formations
Formations
Magdalena River